The great lanternshark (Etmopterus princeps) is a shark of the family Etmopteridae found in the northeast and northwest Atlantic. Its name was given as at the time of its discovery, it was thought to be bioluminescent, but this has been challenged.

Description
This species of shark is slender and small, generally found in deep water. It is a black or a very dark brown, uniformly, in color, and lacks an anal fin. The dorsal fins have an associated spine.

References

Etmopterus
Fish described in 1904